is a former Japanese football player.

Playing career
Abe was born in Niihama on July 5, 1980. He joined J1 League club FC Tokyo from Ryutsu Keizai University in November 2002. He played many matches as substitute forward from 2003. In 2005, he moved to Oita Trinita on loan. However he could not score a goal and returned to FC Tokyo in August. Although he played many matches in 2005, his opportunity to play decreased in 2006. In 2007, he moved to Kashiwa Reysol. However he could not play many matches. In 2008, he moved to J2 League club Shonan Bellmare. He played many matches and Bellmare was promoted to J1 end of 2009 season. Although he played all 34 matches in 2010 season, Bellmare was relegated to J2 in a year. In 2011, he moved to newly was promoted to J1 League club, Ventforet Kofu. Although he played many matches, he could hardly play in the match from summer and Ventforet was relegated to J2. In 2012, he moved to J1 club Júbilo Iwata. Although he played many matches, Júbilo was relegated to J2 end of 2013 season. In 2015, he moved to newly was promoted to J1 League club, Matsumoto Yamaga FC. He retired end of 2015 season.

Club statistics

References

External links

1980 births
Living people
Ryutsu Keizai University alumni
Association football people from Ehime Prefecture
Japanese footballers
J1 League players
J2 League players
FC Tokyo players
Oita Trinita players
Kashiwa Reysol players
Shonan Bellmare players
Ventforet Kofu players
Júbilo Iwata players
Matsumoto Yamaga FC players
Association football forwards